General Motors reused the T-body designation beginning in 1979 with the front-wheel drive Opel Kadett D and the Vauxhall Astra Mk I. This version of the T-body also became widespread throughout the world, including South Africa, where the rear-wheel drive version was not originally available.

Other names for the FWD T platform are the GM2700 and the GM3000, applied to Opel Astra G and Zafira A and their rebadges.

The platform was superseded by GM Delta platform and preceded by the GM T platform (RWD).

List of vehicles
 Australia
Holden Astra TR
Holden Astra TS
Holden Astra AH
HSV VXR Turbo AH
Holden Zafira
 Canada
Asüna GT hatchback
Asüna SE sedan
Passport Optima
Saturn Astra
 Germany
Opel Kadett D
Opel Kadett E
Opel Astra F
Opel Astra G
Opel Astra H 2005-2011
Opel Zafira A
Opel Zafira B 2005-2014
 Indonesia
Opel Kadett D
Opel Optima F
 Japan
Subaru Traviq (rebadged Opel Zafira) A
 Latin America
Chevrolet Zafira A
Chevrolet Zafira B
Chevrolet Astra F
Chevrolet Astra G
Chevrolet Astra H (Chile)
Chevrolet Vectra/Vectra GT H (Brazil & Argentina)
Chevrolet Kadett/Ipanema
 Russia
Chevrolet Viva
 South Africa
Opel Kadett F
Opel Monza (Not to be confused with the German Opel Monza)
 South Korea
Daewoo Cielo
Daewoo Espero (stretched wheelbase)
Daewoo LeMans
Daewoo Nexia
Daewoo Racer
Daewoo Lanos
 Thailand
Opel Astra F
Chevrolet Zafira A
 United Kingdom
Vauxhall Astra Mk1, Mk2, Mk3, Mk4, and Mk5
Vauxhall Belmont
Vauxhall Zafira Mk1
Vauxhall Zafira Mk2 2005-2014
 United States
Pontiac LeMans (also sold in New Zealand)
Saturn Astra
 Uzbekistan
 UzDaewoo Nexia

References

External links
 This list mentions GM2700 as the Astra/Zafira platform
 This list refers to Astras as the GM2700 and GM3000

T (FWD)